The discography of Tigers Jaw, an American rock band, consists of six studio albums, one live album, twelve extended plays and nine singles.

Albums

Studio albums

Live albums

Extended plays

Singles

Other appearances

Music videos

References

Discographies of American artists